The 2016 Pan American Weightlifting Championships was held in Cartagena, Colombia between June 6 and June 11, 2016.

Medal summary
Results are obtained from the IWF website.

Men

Women

References

External links
 Tournament website

Pan American Weightlifting Championships
Pan American Weightlifting Championships
Pan American Weightlifting Championships
International weightlifting competitions hosted by Colombia